PerfectHome is a rent-to-own retailer operating across Great Britain. It enables customers to pay weekly for household and electrical goods.

History 
The business was established on 30 October 2006 and stocks furniture, entertainment devices, appliances and technology. Brands sold include Samsung, LG, Panasonic, Hotpoint and Indesit.

PerfectHome currently has approximately 250 employees and its head office is based in Birmingham.

Customers who buy a product from PerfectHome on a pay weekly basis are entering a hire purchase agreement with the company. The company charges a representative APR of 69.5% APR to 119.9%.

In 2011, American lease-to-own company Aaron's Inc bought a minority stake in PerfectHome, valuing the company at £87m.

In early 2018 PerfectHome saw interest from a number of potential buyers, and in June 2018 the business was sold to Brixworth Investments (UK) Ltd., an affiliate of Elliott Advisors (UK) Limited.

Perfect Home have ceased in accepting new loan and hire purchase agreements as of July 2021

Industry regulator 
In April 2014, the consumer credit industry saw a change in regulator from the Office of Fair Trading (OFT) to the Financial Conduct Authority (FCA). At that time, companies that held an OFT licence and registered for interim permission were allowed to continue carrying out consumer credit activities whilst their applications for FCA authorisation were considered. PerfectHome received FCA authorisation on 14 December 2017.

In April 2019 the FCA introduced a pricing cap for the rent-to-own sector, with a new set of rules about pricing and the total cost of agreements. As an FCA-authorised business, PerfectHome adjusted its offering to reflect the new parameters.

TV Advertising 
In 2016, PerfectHome launched a £4m campaign featuring a talking cat, co-created with Wallace and Gromit creators Aardman Animations

ASA rulings 
On 24 May 2016, PerfectHome broadcast a TV advert which was later challenged by the Advertising Standards Agency (ASA). A viewer argued that the advert didn't give the APR (Annual Percentage Rate) figure adequate prominence, as required. The ASA argued whether the advert, particularly the claim "style up the kitchen with big brand appliances", promoted the purchase of items on high-interest credit in an irresponsible manner. The investigation was upheld and the ASA confirmed that the advert had breached BCAP Code rule 1.2 (Social responsibility). In turn, the advert was removed from broadcast.

On 25 October 2018, PerfectHome broadcast a TV advert which was later challenged by the ASA.  A complaint highlighted that the advert used lyrics from the Fairground Attraction song 'Perfect': "It's got to be perfect, it's got to be worth it. Too many people take second best, but I won't take anything less. It's got to be perfect" while walking around a house that contained a number of high-value items such as an iPad, wireless headphones, an American-style fridge freezer, and a flat screen TV. The ASA argued whether the use of the lyrics combined with luxury items promoted the purchase of items on high-interest credit in an irresponsible manner.

Financial Conduct Authority redress programme 
As PerfectHome worked towards FCA authorisation, the FCA advised the company that some of its historic practices did not meet the standards it expected as the new regulator of consumer credit firms. Processes around theft and accidental damage insurance, cancelled sales and a smaller number of affordability checks did fail some of its customers and were all stopped. In March 2018, PerfectHome agreed with the Financial Conduct Authority (FCA) a package of redress totalling over £2.1 million. This was made up of cash payments and balance write-offs for 37,000 customers.

References

External links 

Companies based in Birmingham, West Midlands
Consumer electronics retailers of the United Kingdom
Consumer electronics brands
Furniture retailers of the United Kingdom